Leucanella is a genus of moths in the family Saturniidae first described by Claude Lemaire in 1969.

Species
The genus includes the following species:

Leucanella acutissima (Walker, 1865)
Leucanella anikae Meister & Brechlin, 2002
Leucanella apollinairei (Dognin, 1923)
Leucanella aspera (R. Felder & Rogenhofer, 1874)
Leucanella atahualpa Meister & Naumann, 2006
Leucanella bivius (Bouvier, 1927)
Leucanella contei (Lemaire, 1967)
Leucanella contempta (Lemaire, 1967)
Leucanella flammans (Schaus, 1900)
Leucanella fusca (Walker, 1855)
Leucanella gibbosa (Conte, 1906)
Leucanella heisleri (E. D. Jones, 1908)
Leucanella hosmera (Schaus, 1941)
Leucanella janeira (Westwood, 1854)
Leucanella lama (Berg, 1883)
Leucanella leucane (Geyer, 1837)
Leucanella lynx (Bouvier, 1930)
Leucanella maasseni (Moeschler, 1872)
Leucanella memusae (Walker, 1855)
Leucanella memusoides Lemaire, 1973
Leucanella muelleri (Draudt, 1929)
Leucanella newmani (Lemaire, 1967)
Leucanella nyctimene (Latreille, 1832)
Leucanella saturata (Walker, 1855)
Leucanella stuarti (W. Rothschild & Jordan, 1901)
Leucanella viettei (Lemaire, 1967)
Leucanella viridescens (Walker, 1855)
Leucanella yungasensis Meister & Naumann, 2006

References

Hemileucinae